Ithrayum Kaalam is a 1987 Indian Malayalam film, directed by I. V. Sasi and produced by N. G. John. The film stars Madhu, Mammootty, Ratheesh and Seema in the lead roles. The film has musical score by Shyam.

Cast

Madhu as Chackochen Muthalali
Mammootty as Varghese Chacko
Ratheesh as Mathukutty Chacko
Lalu Alex as Alex Chacko
Jose as James Chacko
Rahman as Pappachan Paily
Shankar as Sulaiman
T. G. Ravi as Paili
Shobhana as Savithri Thamburatti
Seema as Anna  Mathukutty 
Manavalan Joseph as Meledathu Kurup
Bahadoor as Khaader
Sankaradi as Ayalkunnam Maani
Prathapachandran as Valiya Thirumeni
Sathaar as Krishnankutty
Anjali Naidu as Sherly Alex
Balan K. Nair as Kunjankutty Hajiyar
Maniyanpilla Raju as Unni Thirumeni
Thrissur Elsy
Bheeman Raghu 
Kundara Johnny as Raaju
Kuthiravattam Pappu as Shankunni Nair
Nanditha Bose as Mariya Paily
Sabitha Anand as Sainaba
Shafeeq as Kunjumon Paily
Soorya as Ambujam 
Kalaranjini as Mollykutty James
Sonia as Savithri
Kannur Sreelatha as Sreedevi Thamburatti
Surekha as Saraswathi Thamburatti
Thodupuzha Vasanthi as Ammukutty Nair

Soundtrack
The music was composed by Shyam and the lyrics were written by Yusufali Kechery.

Track listing

References

External links
 

1987 films
1980s Malayalam-language films
Films directed by I. V. Sasi
Films with screenplays by T. Damodaran